Von Mühlenen is a Swiss cheese brand from near Fribourg in Düdingen. 

It has over fifteen dairies making various cheeses sold under the Von Mühlenen brand. 

It has won the main prize in World Cheese Awards several times: In 1992 and 2005 for Le Gruyère Premier Cru, in 2002 and 2015 for Le Gruyère AOC Reserve.

History
1864: Established by Andreas von Mühlenen (1845–) in Bern
1910: Continued by his son Ernst von Mühlenen (–1934), also joined by his brother Eugen von Mühlenen. 
1934: Continued by his son Walo von Mühlenen (–1972) 
c. 1970: Moved to Fribourg
1972: Continued by his son Roger von Mühlenen. 
1996: Continued by his son Walo von Mühlenen
2006: Sold to the Cremo SA dairy  of Villars-sur-Glâne.

Affineur Walo of Mühlenen
Since the 2006 sale, the von Mühlenens  established a new brand Affineur Walo of Mühlenen in 2011, located in nearby Granges Paccot. In the 2015 World Cheese Awards Walo was  awarded twelve medals for various cheeses, among these for "Super Gold" the spicy semi-hard Stärnächäs and Armailii de la Gruyère.

References

Cheesemakers
Fribourg
Dairy products companies of Switzerland